Fc receptor-like protein 2 is a protein that in humans is encoded by the FCRL2 gene.

References

Further reading

Fc receptors